John Martin alias Honychurch (by 1502 – 16 November 1545) was an English politician.

He was a Member of Parliament for Plympton Erle in 1529.

References

1545 deaths
Members of the Parliament of England for Plympton Erle
English MPs 1529–1536
Year of birth uncertain